Marie Le Nepvou (born 25 January 1985) is a French rower. She competed in the women's coxless pair event at the 2016 Summer Olympics. She also won a gold medal at the 2004 World Rowing Championships on the Lake of Banyoles in Catalonia, Spain, in the women's four event.

References

External links

1985 births
Living people
French female rowers
Olympic rowers of France
Rowers at the 2016 Summer Olympics
Sportspeople from Saint-Brieuc
World Rowing Championships medalists for France
21st-century French women
20th-century French women